Kebal is a locality situated in Strömstad Municipality, Västra Götaland County, Sweden with 258 inhabitants in 2010.

References 

Populated places in Västra Götaland County
Populated places in Strömstad Municipality